George Wilbur Farr (July 6, 1875 – March 28, 1957) was an appointed Justice of the Montana Supreme Court, serving from 1922 to 1923.

Born in Hamilton County, Nebraska, Farr received his law degree from Nebraska University in 1896. Farr came to Montana in 1896 and settled in Miles City, Montana, establishing his law practice. He served as Mayor of Miles City from May 3, 1909 to May 2, 1911 and served as president of the Montana Bar Association. On May 24, 1922, Governor J. Hugo Aronson appointed Farr to a seat on the Montana Supreme Court vacated by the death of Justice Frank B. Reynolds. After completing his term on the court, Farr returned to Miles City where he died at the age of 81.

References

1875 births
1957 deaths
People from Hamilton County, Nebraska
University of Nebraska alumni
Justices of the Montana Supreme Court
People from Miles City, Montana